Mátraterenye is a village in Nógrád County, Hungary with 1,878 inhabitants (2014).

Notes 

Populated places in Nógrád County